Steve Avila (born October 16, 1999) is an American football center for the TCU Horned Frogs.

Early life and high school
Avila grew up in Arlington, Texas and attended South Grand Prairie High School. Avila was rated a four-star recruit and committed to play college football at TCU over offers from Kansas State and Utah.

College career
Avila redshirted his freshman season at TCU. He played in 11 games as a redshirt freshman. Avila started nine games during his redshirt sophomore season with six at center, two at right tackle, and one at guard. He was named first team All-Big 12 Conference by the Associated Press and to the second team by the league's coaches.

References

External links
TCU Horned Frogs bio

Living people
All-American college football players
American football centers
TCU Horned Frogs football players
Players of American football from Texas
American football offensive guards
1999 births